Ricardo Willy Elmont (16 September 1954 – 2 September 2013) was a Surinamese judoka, who represented his country at the 1976 Summer Olympics.

Elmont took up judo seriously in 1970 and went on to win the national middleweight title three years running from 1972 to 1974, he went on to win a bronze medal in the 1974 Central American and Caribbean Games and finished fourth four years later at the 1978 Central American and Caribbean Games, between those two appearances he competed for Suriname at the 1976 Summer Olympics in Montreal, Canada, he entered the 80 kg event, in the first round he lost to Soviet Valeriy Dvoynikov, he then went on to the repechage but lost his contest against Süheyl Yesilnur from Turkey so didn't advance any further. He also competed at the 1975 Pan American Games in Mexico City.

In 1979, Elmont left Suriname and moved to the Netherlands, where he had two sons, Guillaume Elmont and Dex Elmont who both went on to represent the Netherlands in judo at three Olympics each.

Elmont was awarded the Suriname Sportsperson of the Year in 1974.

Elmont died two weeks before his 59th birthday.

References

1954 births
2013 deaths
Sportspeople from Paramaribo
Surinamese male judoka
Competitors at the 1974 Central American and Caribbean Games
Competitors at the 1978 Central American and Caribbean Games
Central American and Caribbean Games bronze medalists for Suriname
Judoka at the 1975 Pan American Games
Pan American Games competitors for Suriname
Judoka at the 1976 Summer Olympics
Olympic judoka of Suriname
Surinamese emigrants to the Netherlands
Central American and Caribbean Games medalists in judo
20th-century Surinamese people
21st-century Surinamese people